Monsey may refer to:

Monsey, New York, a hamlet in Rockland County, New York, United States
Monsey, Benin, a town and arrondissement in Alibori Department, Benin
Messenger Monsey (1694–1788), English physician and humourist